Gastão Vidigal is a municipality in the state of São Paulo in Brazil. The population is 4,860 (2020 est.) in an area of 181 km². The town was settled in the first part of the 20th century, at first under the name Brioso. The municipality was established in 1955 by separating it from Nhandeara, and at the same time it was renamed Gastão Vidigal after a banker who opened a branch of the Banco Mercantil de São Paulo in the town. The small town produces milk, corn, cotton, and coffee.

References

Municipalities in São Paulo (state)